Catacaos District is one of ten districts of the province Piura in Peru.

References

External links
  Municipal web site